Wila Quta (Aymara wila blood red, blood, quta, lake, "red lake", also spelled Wila Khota, Wila Kkota) is a  mountain in the Cordillera Real in the Bolivian Andes. It is situated in the La Paz Department, Murillo Province, Palca Municipality. Wila Quta lies southwest of Mururata and Qutapata and northeast of Janq'u Qalani.

References 

Mountains of La Paz Department (Bolivia)